Hypermethylated in cancer 2 protein is a protein that in humans is encoded by the HIC2 gene.

References

Further reading

External links 
 

Transcription factors